Rishton Ka Mela is an Indian television mini-series, which premiered on 27 April 2015 on Zee TV. The series was produced by Essel Vision Productions. It was a mini-series, consisting of only 10 episodes, and ended on 8 May 2015. Indian television actors and actresses Sargun Mehta, Sayantani Ghosh, Karan Veer Mehra, Ratan Rajput, Usha Nadkarni, Eijaz Khan, Anupam Shyam, Karan Grover and Dhriti Bhatia were signed for the series.

Cast
Sargun Mehta as Dipika
Sayantani Ghosh as Naina/Naagin 
Adaa Khan as Shruti
 Dhriti Bhatia as Radha 
Karan Veer Mehra as Karan Singh Gurjar 
Usha Nadkarni as Shanta Tai/Mela(Fare)'s owner
Eijaz Khan as Inspector Hooda
Anupam Shyam as Sahukaar
 Tanushree Kaushal as Jhumri's Mother In Law 
 Poonampreet Bhatia as Ritu 
 Farhina Parvez as Mandy 
Hiten Tejwani as Rahul 
 Srman Jain as Stephan
Smita Singh as Kamla 
Ratan Rajput as Jhumri
Gauri Pradhan Tejwani as Neha
Karan Grover as Akshay

Music 
Title themes were composed by Mohit Pathak & background score was done by Mohit Pathak & Shailesh Suvarna.

References

2015 Indian television series debuts
2015 Indian television series endings
Hindi-language television shows
Television shows set in Mumbai
Zee TV original programming
2010s Indian television miniseries